Davor Zdravkovski (Macedonian: Давор Здравковски; born 20 March 1998) is a Macedonian professional footballer who currently plays for AEL Limassol as a defensive midfielder.

Club career
Born in Skopje, Zdravkovski played in Macedonia for the youth team of Makedonija Gjorche Petrov, until the summer in 2015 when he made his first appearance for the senior team of the club, competing in the Macedonian Second League. At the end of the season, his club won promotion to the Macedonian First League where he remained regular in the starting squad throughout his entire first season in the top trier, being capped 33 times in 36 rounds.

In August 2017, he left Macedonia to join the Cypriot First Division club AEL Limassol, with whom he signed a three-year contract. Two months later, on 26 October 2017, he also made his debut for his new club by entering the game in the 63rd minute in the league game against Olympiakos Nicosia.

International career
He has been a regular member of Macedonian U-19 and U-21 national teams.

References

External links
 

1998 births
Living people
Footballers from Skopje
Association football midfielders
Macedonian footballers
North Macedonia youth international footballers
North Macedonia under-21 international footballers
FK Makedonija Gjorče Petrov players
AEL Limassol players
Macedonian First Football League players
Cypriot First Division players
Macedonian expatriate footballers
Macedonian expatriate sportspeople in Cyprus
Expatriate footballers in Cyprus